Xylophanes ceratomioides is a moth of the  family Sphingidae. It is known from Mexico, Belize, Costa Rica, French Guiana, Bolivia, Argentina and Venezuela, down into southern Brazil. Rare vagrants have been found up to southern Arizona.

Description 
The wingspan is 86–96 mm. The outer margin of the forewing is slightly scalloped. There are long, narrow, whitish scales on the upperside of the abdomen. The base of the forewing upperside is dark, often almost black but with an off-white patch on the inner edge. The costa has several conspicuous subapical and apical black spots, the largest subapical spot is triangular with the inner point directed basally. The subbasal band of the hindwing upperside is off-white, divided medially into two patches by a longitudinal black band.

Biology 
Adults are on wing year-round in Costa Rica. In Peru, there are at least three generations per year with adults on wing from January to February, June to July and October.

The larvae feed on Psychotria berteriana, Psychotria correae, Psychotria microdon and Hamelia patens. They are generally very dark, but there is also a green morph. They have a small cream eye on each side and a lighter gray-brown patch around each spiracle.

References

External links
Xylophanes ceratomioides Sphingidae of the Americas

ceratomioides
Moths described in 1867
Sphingidae of South America
Moths of South America
Taxa named by Coleman Townsend Robinson
Taxa named by Augustus Radcliffe Grote